Pammene amygdalana is a species of moth of the family Tortricidae. It is found from Belgium and Germany to the Iberian Peninsula, Italy, Austria and Hungary and from France to Romania and Bulgaria.

The wingspan is 12–15 mm. Adults are on wing from April to August in one generation per year.

The larvae live as an inquiline in cynipid galls on various plant species, including Andricus kollari, Andricus conglomeratus, Andricus hungaricus, Andricus lucidus and Aphelonyx cerricola. They often consume the cynipid larva as well as gall tissue.

References

Moths described in 1842
Grapholitini
Moths of Europe
Moths of Asia